Janthinobacterium is a genus of Gram-negative soil bacteria. The name is from Latin janthinus, which means "violet" or "violet-blue". It  produces a purple-violet pigment, manifests diverse energy metabolism abilities, and tolerates cold, ultraviolet radiation, and other environmental stressors.

References

http://genomea.asm.org/content/4/1/e01600-15

Burkholderiales
Bacteria genera